James Delianov (born 20 October 1999), is an Australian professional footballer who plays as a goalkeeper for Adelaide United.

Club career

Melbourne City
Having spent 3 years in the Melbourne City youth system, in March 2017, he signed a multi-year contract for the senior team for two seasons. Delianov made his senior debut in a Round 27 A-League match against the Central Coast Mariners on 26 April 2019, a match which ended in a 5–0 victory for Melbourne City and a clean sheet for Delianov.
Delianov was released by the Club.

Western United
At the conclusion of the 2018–19 A-League season, it was announced that Delianov had been released by Melbourne City and would join Western United, signing a two-year deal ahead of the 2019–20 A-League season. At the end of the season, in November 2020, Delianov departed the club to pursue other football opportunities.

Adelaide United
A few hours after leaving Western United, rival A-League club Adelaide United FC announced signing Delianov on a two-year contract. Delianov made his debut against former side Western United, impressing and keeping a clean sheet in a 0–0 draw.

International career 

James Delianov was selected to represent Australia in the FIFA U-17 World Cup but unfortunately did not play in the tournament. In 2018, Delianov went into camp with the Young Socceroos in preparation for the 2018 AFC U-19 Championship.

Career statistics

Club

Notes

References

External links

1999 births
Living people
Australian soccer players
Association football goalkeepers
Melbourne City FC players
Western United FC players
Adelaide United FC players
A-League Men players
National Premier Leagues players
Australian people of Macedonian descent